The Latin American Table Tennis Cup is an annual table tennis competition being held since 2011. It consists of Men's and Women's Singles events. Only 12 invited players and no more than 3 players per association are allowed to participate in each event. Starting from 2013, it is recognised as the qualification event for the Table Tennis World Cup. The competitions are organized by the Latin American Table Tennis Union and sanctioned by International Table Tennis Federation (ITTF) and classified as R3 in rating weightings, B4 in bonus weightings in the ITTF world ranking.

Winners

Men's singles

Women's singles

References 

 
Table tennis competitions
Table tennis in Latin America